Jacksboro Municipal Airport  is a public airport in Jacksboro, Jack County, Texas, United States, located  northeast of the central business district. The airport has no IATA or ICAO designation. 

The airport is used solely for general aviation purposes.

Facilities 
 Runway 17/35: 3,220 x 75 ft. (982 x 23 m), Surface: Asphalt

For the 12-month period ending 8 February 2018, the airport had 1,500 aircraft operations, an average of 4 per day: 100% general aviation. At that time there were 10 aircraft based at this airport: 80% single-engine, 10%  multi-engine, and 10% ultralights, with no helicopters, jets, or gliders.

References

External links 
 Official Website
  at Texas DOT Airport Directory

Airports in Texas
Transportation in Jack County, Texas